Aziz Ur Rahman Hazarvi (also known as Pir Azizur Rahman Hazarvi) (2 February 1948 – 23 June 2020) (Urdu: عزیز الرحمٰن ہزاروی), was a Pakistani Islamic Scholar, senior leader of Jamiat Ulema-e-Islam (F) and founder of Darul Uloom Zakaria in Islamabad.
He was the authorized disciple of Muhammad Zakariyya al-Kandhlawi. His disciples include Muhammad Ilyas Ghuman.

Biography
Hazarvi was among the disciples of Muhammad Zakariyya Kandhlawi. He was a member of Wifaq ul Madaris Al-Arabia and a senior leader of Jamiat Ulama-e-Islam. He supervised the Islamabad unit of the Jamiat Ulama-e-Islam.
Hazārvi established Darul Uloom Zakariya in Tarnol, Islamabad in the memory of his teacher Kandhlawi.

Hazārvi authorized various people in the Chishti branch of Tasawwuf. His notable disciples include Muhammad Ilyas Ghuman.

Death
Aged 72, Hazarvi died on 23 June 2020. His funeral prayer was led by Syed Mukhtaruddin Shah. Jamiat Ulema-e-Islam (F) leader, Fazlur Rehman, Abdul Ghafoor Haideri and Maulana Abdul Wasay expressed sorrow and grief over his demise. His funeral was attended by scholars including Syed Adnan Kakakhail.

References

1948 births
2020 deaths
Pakistani Islamic religious leaders
Pakistani Sunni Muslim scholars of Islam
Darul Uloom Haqqania alumni
People from Battagram District
Deobandis